The Bristol Academy Aztecs are an American football team based in Filton, South Gloucestershire, England, who operate in the BAFA National Leagues Premier Division South, the highest level of British American football. They operate from the Stoke Gifford Stadium in Filton, although they represent the nearby City of Bristol which is where the team were formed.  Formed in 1990, The Aztecs are two-time BritBowl runners-up having missed out on the prize in 1999 and 2004. In 2020 the Aztecs football programme merged with the Filton Academy Pride setup, basing their full Academy setup at the SGS College.

Founded in 2010, the club operate a B Team called the Bristol Apache who play in the BAFA National Leagues SFC West 2, the third level of American football in Britain. Unlike the Aztecs, the Apache play out of South Gloucestershire and Stroud College. In 2017 The Apache were promoted to the SFC Division 1, spending a season in the second tier before being relegated back to SFC 2 for the following year.

Aztecs history
The Aztecs had their strongest start in many seasons, winning their first seven games straight and beating the Sussex Thunder, the Coventry Jets and the Farnham Knights both home and away. Two defeats against the London Blitz and a home-win reverse against the London Cobras secured second place in the BAFA standings; Ultimately the Aztecs could not capitalise on their season record, losing again to the Jets in the playoffs.

The youth team fared better however, blanking the Kent Exiles 30–0 in the quarter final, then coming from 28–6 down to overcome the London Blitz in the semi-final to make the national finals at Worcester's Sixways stadium.  Meeting the undefeated Lancashire Wolverines in the bowl game, the Aztecs rolled to an impressive 36–14 victory to become youth national champions for the first time.

Setup
The Aztecs field a senior team in the Premier Division, as well as youth teams and a second adult contact team Apache who play in Division Two. The team was formed in 1990 and has played in all BAFL divisions and been in four Britbowl Finals. They remained in the Premier division following the 2007 BAFL re-alignment, and have competed at the top national level since.

Prior to the 2020 Season Bristol Aztecs announced they were formally joining the SGS College's Academy Setup and Joining the Bristol Academy Pride Branding new uniforms, colours, helmets and logo's.

Team colours 
Following a re-branding prior to the 2020 Season the Bristol Academy Aztecs Play in Silver helmets with the new team logo with a Navy and white stripe, silver Jerseys with navy numbers, Silver pants with navy details and white socks. A Change uniform will involve The same helmet, pants and socks with a Navy Jersey with White Numbers. Bristol Apache will also play in the same uniforms.

Previously, the Bristol Aztecs played in Black Helmets (with the Aztecs 'Feathered A' Decal), orange jerseys with black numbers, black pants, and orange and white socks. In previous seasons, the Aztecs have worn grey jerseys with orange numbers and black jerseys with orange numbers. Throughout these uniform changes, the Helmet with the Feathered A decal has been consistent. Bristol Apache Previously played in Orange Jerseys with White Numbers, Black Pants with White socks and the same Black 'Feathered A' Decal.

Season records

References

External links 
Bristol University Barracuda Official Site
BAFA Official Site

BAFA National League teams
American football teams in England
Sport in Bristol
South Gloucestershire and Stroud College
American football teams established in 1990
1990 establishments in England